Realignment may refer to:

 Political realignment, or realigning election, especially in US history and political science
 Realignment plan, also known as Israeli convergence plan
 Realignment (sports)
 Wheel alignment 
 "Re-Align", song by Godsmack from the album Faceless

See also 
 Public Safety Realignment initiative
 Alignment (disambiguation)